The 1928 Bavarian state election was held on 20 May 1928 to elect the 128 members of the Landtag of Bavaria.

Results

References 

1928 elections in Germany
1928